Patrik Allvin (born 10 October 1974) is a Swedish former ice hockey player and current general manager of the Vancouver Canucks.

Playing career
During his ice hockey playing career, Allvin played for Leksands IF in the Swedish Elitserien, as well as numerous other clubs in the Swedish Division 1. He also played for the Quebec Rafales (previously the Atlanta Knights) in the IHL, and the Pensacola Ice Pilots (previously the Nashville Knights) in the ECHL.

Management career
Allvin worked as the European scout for the Montreal Canadiens between 2002 and 2006. He worked for the Pittsburgh Penguins for 16 years, winning three Stanley Cups (first as European Scout and back-to-back as Director of Amateur Scouting), and eventually worked up to Assistant General Manager and interim GM after the departure of Jim Rutherford.

On January 26, 2022, Allvin was announced as the 12th general manager in Canucks history (replacing Jim Benning), the first Swedish general manager in the NHL.

References

1974 births
Living people
Montreal Canadiens scouts
National Hockey League general managers
Pittsburgh Penguins executives
Pittsburgh Penguins scouts
Swedish ice hockey players
Swedish sports executives and administrators
Vancouver Canucks general managers
People from Leksand Municipality
Sportspeople from Dalarna County